Hemichroa australis is a species of sawflies in the family Tenthredinidae.

Description
Head and thorax are bright red, while the mesopleuron and the abdomen are shiny black.

This sawfly is similar to Hemichroa crocea, which has a bright orange abdomen and legs.

Larvae feed on alder (Alnus species) and birch (Betula species).

Distribution
This species can be found in most of Europe.

References

External links
 The sawflies (Symphyta) of Britain and Ireland
 Bembix
 Mattelart

Tenthredinidae
Insects described in 1823